The 24th Annual Tony Awards was broadcast by NBC television on April 19, 1970, from the Mark Hellinger Theatre in New York City. Hosts were Julie Andrews, Shirley MacLaine and Walter Matthau.

The ceremony
Presenters: Clive Barnes, Mia Farrow, Elliott Gould, Claire Bloom, Michael Caine, Jack Cassidy, David Frost, Cary Grant, Patricia Neal, George C. Scott, James Stewart, Maggie Smith, Robert Stephens.

Musicals represented:
 Applause ("Applause" - Bonnie Franklin and Company/"Welcome to the Theatre" and "Applause" (reprise) - Lauren Bacall and Company)
 Coco ("Always Mademoiselle" - Katharine Hepburn and Company)
 Purlie ("I Got Love" - Melba Moore/"Walk Him up the Stairs" - Cleavon Little and Company)

Winners and nominees
Winners are in bold

Special awards
Sir Noël Coward for his multiple and immortal contributions to the theatre
Alfred Lunt and Lynn Fontanne
New York Shakespeare Festival, for pioneering efforts on behalf of new plays
Barbra Streisand – Star of the Decade

Multiple nominations and awards

These productions had multiple nominations:

11 nominations: Applause  
7 nominations: Coco
6 nominations: Child's Play 
5 nominations: Purlie
4 nominations: Last of the Red Hot Lovers 
3 nominations: Borstal Boy, Butterflies Are Free and Indians    
2 nominations: Billy, The Chinese and Dr. Fish, Cry for Us All, Georgy and A Patriot for Me    

The following productions received multiple awards.

5 wins: Child's Play 
4 wins: Applause
2 wins: Coco and Purlie

References

External links
Tony Awards Official Site

Tony Awards ceremonies
1970 in theatre
1970 awards
1970 awards in the United States
1970 in New York City
1970s in Manhattan